Alberto Fortis (born 3 June 1955 in Domodossola) is an Italian musician and songwriter.

Fortis, who released his first album Alberto Fortis in 1979, is the composer of both music and lyrics, and has directed the video clips for three of his songs. Alberto Fortis contains a famous song "Milano e Vincenzo". In Italy it is known "Vincenzo, io t'ammazzerò" ("Vincent, I'm going to kill you") as well, from the first words in the song, where Fortis is angry with Vincenzo Micocci, his first producer.

His discography includes recordings from official collections and live recordings with a dozen discs made in Italy and abroad (Los Angeles, New York City and London). Three of his albums have gone gold.

In the late eighties and early nineties Fortis wrote poetry which was published in two books, Tributo giapponese (1988) and Dentro il giardino (1994), both of which were edited by Giovanni Tranchida.

Much in vogue in the eighties, Fortis has recently experienced a lull in his career; however, he returned to prominence in 2006 with his participation in the third edition of the reality show Music Farm, hosted by Simona Ventura (a show similar to the Hit Me, Baby, One More Time format) on Rai Due.

Discography 
Discography:
 1979 - Alberto Fortis (Album)
 1980 - Tra demonio e santità
 1981 - La grande grotta
 1982 - Fragole infinite
 1984 - El nino
 1985 - West of Broadway
 1987 - Assolutamente tuo
 1990 - Carta del cielo 
 1991 - L'uovo (Live-Album) 1991 - Fortissimo 1994 - Dentro al giardino 2001 - Angeldom 2003 - Universo Fortis 2005 - Fiori sullo schermo futuro 2014 - Do l'anima 2016 - Con Te'' EP ( Sony Music Italia )

References

1955 births
Living people
Italian songwriters
Male songwriters
20th-century Italian musicians
21st-century Italian musicians
20th-century Italian male musicians
21st-century Italian male musicians